Shaffaq Mohammed  (born 21 July 1972) is a British politician who served as a Liberal Democrats Member of the European Parliament (MEP) for the Yorkshire and the Humber from 2019 to 2020.

Early life
Shaffaq Mohammed was born in Pakistani administered Kashmir. In April of 1977 he moved to Sheffield and studied at Park House school and later on in life graduated from the University of Sheffield.

Political career

Sheffield City Council
Between 2004 and 2014 Mohammed served as the Liberal Democrat councillor for Broomhill Ward. He contested Crookes Ward in 2014 and was defeated. He returned as a councillor for Ecclesall Ward in 2016 and was re-elected in 2018.

Mohammed was elected as leader of the Liberal Democrat Group on Sheffield City Council in May 2011. He lost this position when he lost his seat as a councillor in 2014. Following his return to the council he was re-elected as group leader in May 2016.

In the 2015 Dissolution Honours, Mohammed was appointed a Member of the Order of the British Empire (MBE) "for political service" as a councillor on Sheffield City Council.

UK Parliament
Mohammed stood as the Liberal Democrat candidate in the 2016 Sheffield Brightside and Hillsborough by-election, where he finished third with 6.1% of the vote.

He was the Liberal Democrat candidate for the Sheffield Central constituency in the 2017 general election, coming fourth.

European Parliament
Mohammed served as a Liberal Democrats Member of the European Parliament (MEP) for the Yorkshire and the Humber from 2019 to 2020.

References

1972 births
Living people
MEPs for England 2019–2020
Liberal Democrats (UK) MEPs
Members of the Order of the British Empire
British politicians of Pakistani descent